Jamie Farndale (born 21 February 1994) is a Scottish rugby union player who plays for the Scotland national rugby sevens team in the World Rugby Sevens Series. 

Farndale has previously played for United Rugby Championship side Edinburgh Rugby.

Early life and education

Farndale left school in 2011, where he lifted the Brewin Dolphin Scottish Schools' Cup for Edinburgh Academy at under-15 level in 2008 and the following year, for the Academy's under-18 side. He was part of the U18 runners up side in 2010.

Rugby career
From leaving school, Farndale signed as an EDP with Edinburgh Rugby, and became a mainstay of the international under-20 side from an early age, featuring in no fewer than three IRB Junior World Championships (2012, 2013 and 2014). He finished his final tournament as joint, all-time top try-scorer (10). He also captained the youth commonwealth games sevens team in 2011 who finished 4th.

In the 2011–12 season he capped an impressive season by finishing as top try scorer in the 2012 JWC in South Africa.

A leg break in October marred his attempts to add to his first senior competitive appearance in the last match of the 2011–12 season against Cardiff, however he returned in time for the 2013 World Championships in France, before going on to join the all-time leader board in 2014.

From 2015, Farndale joined the Scotland national sevens team and played in every tournament for the next two seasons, being awarded player of the season and making selection for the wider Olympic training squad at the end of the first. He was part of both teams that won in London in 2016 and 2017 and was part of the first Scottish team to beat a team from New Zealand, scoring 2 tries in the come back from 21-0 to win 24-21.

He represented Edinburgh at under-16 level in 2009 and 2010, and was included in the extended Scotland under-17 squad that travelled to Valladolid in Spain, in 2010.

Farndale competed at the 2022 Rugby World Cup Sevens in Cape Town.

Personal life 
Aside from rugby, he has represented Scotland against England, Ireland and Wales in pentathlon.

References

External links 
 http://www.edinburghrugby.org/edinburgh-rugby/player/jamie-farndale

1994 births
Living people
Scottish rugby union players
People educated at Edinburgh Academy
Edinburgh Rugby players
Male rugby sevens players
Scotland international rugby sevens players
Rugby union wings
Rugby union players from Winchester
Rugby sevens players at the 2022 Commonwealth Games